SC Fives was a French association football club from Fives, a suburb in the east of Lille. Founded in 1901, the club merged with Olympique Lillois in 1944 to form Lille OSC.

Honours
Championnat de France
Runner-up : 1934
Coupe de France
Finalist : 1941.

Coaches
  George Berry: coach from 1936 to 1944, first coach of Lille OSC (1944–1946)

Bibliography

References

Defunct football clubs in France
Lille OSC
Association football clubs established in 1901
Association football clubs disestablished in 1944
1901 establishments in France
1944 disestablishments in France
Football clubs in Hauts-de-France
Ligue 1 clubs